Dr Csaba Őry (born 12 May 1952, in Budapest) is a Hungarian politician and Member of the European Parliament (MEP) with the Fidesz, part of the European People's Party. He sits on the European Parliament's Committee on Employment and Social Affairs.

Őry is a substitute for the Committee on Development and a member of the Delegation to the EU-Former Yugoslav Republic of Macedonia Joint Parliamentary Committee.

Personal life
He is married. His wife is Tamara Illényi. They have two daughters, Katalin and Annamária.

Education
 1978: PhD, Political Science and Law

Career
 since 1988: Founder and spokesman of the Democratic Union of Scientific Workers
 Administrator and Vice-Chairman (1988–1993), Chairman (1994), LIGA trade unions
 since 1996: Head, Employment Policy and Labour Affairs Workshop, FIDESZ party
 Member of the Hungarian Parliament, Political Undersecretary of State, Ministry of Social and Family Affairs
 since 1998: political Undersecretary of State, Prime Minister's Office
 Member of the Hungarian Parliament, Vice-Chairman of the Committee on Employment
 1998–2004: Member of the Budapest Board
 1998: Vice-Chairman of the Committee on Employment and Labour Affairs
 since 2002: Vice-Chairman of the Committee on Employment and Labour Affairs, Chairman, Hungarian-Vietnamese-Cambodian-Laotian Section, IPU
 1998–2000: Political Undersecretary of State, Social and Family Affairs Ministry
 2000–2002: Political Undersecretary of State, Prime Minister's Office
 1999–2002: Representative of the Hungarian Government to the ILO (1998–2002), Chairman of the Hungarian National Council for the ILO
 2003–2004: Observer at the European Parliament
 1998–1999: Member of the Governing Body, ILO
 1999: Chairman of the Resolution Committee, ILO Conference
 1998–2002: Chairman of the Subcommittee on Social Affairs of the Slovak-Hungarian Joint Committee

See also
 2004 European Parliament election in Hungary

References

External links
 
 

1952 births
Living people
Politicians from Budapest
Fidesz politicians
Fidesz MEPs
MEPs for Hungary 2004–2009
MEPs for Hungary 2009–2014
Members of the National Assembly of Hungary (1998–2002)
Members of the National Assembly of Hungary (2002–2006)